The Miss Cook Islands is the national beauty pageant in the Cook Islands in under Miss Cook Islands Association (MCIA). The current reigning titleholder is Tajiya Sahay who was crowned in October 2019.

History

Early
The Maine Kuki Airani (Miss Cook Islands) national pageant was held for the first time in 1960 and was usually happening in every two years. In the Miss Cook Islands pageant, beauty encompasses physical attributes and qualities that are seen to represent the community at large; respectability, talent and commitment to Cook Islands value. An yet, competing for the representative role of Miss Cook Islands necessitates that the participants negotiate contradictory moral proscriptions that define Cook Islands femininity.

International competitions
In 1998 the Miss Cook Islands franchised the Miss Universe and Miss South Pacific licenses. The Miss Cook Islands was patronized by Pa Te Ariki Upokotini Marie and Ui Ariki. Between 1983 and 1999 the Miss Cook Islands winners went to the Miss Universe competition.  

Today, Miss Cook Islands is patronised by the First Lady - Mrs Akaiti Puna - the wife of Prime Minister - Hon. Henry Puna.  Miss Cook Islands Association ('MCIA') is a non-profit organisation that owns and operates the Miss Cook Islands Pageant, based on Rarotonga, the Cook Islands. It has evolved into a professionally operated pageant with a passion & focus on developing young Cook Islands women to be the best versions of themselves; and giving them opportunities to showcase their talent & skill on a world stage.  

'Identity & Heritage' are the core themes of Miss Cook Islands as the pageant strives to ignite cultural pride & self-worth in Cook Islands youth.  The main sponsors of the pageant include the Government of the Cook Islands and the largest companies in the Cook Islands.   Every year the Miss Cook Islands prepares the Top 3 to Miss World, Miss International and Miss Grand International competitions. 2018, 2nd Runner up will represent the country at Miss Grand International; 1st Runner up will represent the country at Miss International; Miss Cook Islands will represent the country at Miss World. 2020 will see the return of Miss Cook Islands to Miss Universe, in addition to Miss World and Miss Grand International 2020. Miss Cook Islands 2019 Coronation is scheduled for Saturday 26 October 2019 at the National Auditorium at Rarotonga, Cook Islands.

Titleholders

References

Cook Islands
Cook Islands
Cook Islands
Cook Islands
Cook Islands awards
Recurring events established in 1960